Miscera is a genus of moths in the family Brachodidae.

Species
Miscera ambigua (Turner, 1942)  (Australia)
Miscera ampla (Turner, 1942) (Australia)
Miscera androgyna Turner, 1913  (Australia)
Miscera basichrysa (Lower, 1916)  (Australia)
Miscera basichrysa extensa Kallies, 1998 (New Guinea)
Miscera centropis Meyrick, 1907  (Australia)
Miscera conspersa (Turner, 1942)  (Australia)
Miscera desmotoma (Lower, 1896)  (Australia)
Miscera dohertyi Kallies, 1998 (Assam: India)
Miscera episcota (Lower, 1903) (Australia)
Miscera eubrachycera (Diakonoff, [1968]) (the Philippines)
Miscera holodisca Meyrick, 1907  (Australia)
Miscera homotona (Swinhoe, 1892)  (Australia)
Miscera isomacha (Meyrick, 1925)  (Australia)
Miscera leucopis Meyrick, 1907  (Australia)
Miscera lygropis Turner, 1913  (Australia)
Miscera mesochrysa (Lower, 1903)  (Australia)
Miscera micrastra Meyrick, 1907  (Australia)
Miscera minahasa Kallies, 2013 (Sulawesi)
Miscera omichleutis Meyrick, 1907  (Australia)
Miscera orthaula Meyrick, 1907  (Australia)
Miscera pammelas Turner, 1913  (Australia)
Miscera resumptana Walker, 1863  (Australia)

Former species
Miscera orpheus Kallies, 2004
Miscera sauteri Kallies, 2004

References

Brachodidae